Sergio "Bobo" Gori (born 24 February 1946) is an Italian former football player, who played as a midfielder and a striker.

Club career
Born in Milan, Gori debuted with Internazionale at a very young age, making 10 caps between 1964 and 1966, during the time of the Grande Inter team of the 60s. He was sent to gain experience with Lanerossi Vicenza for two seasons, in exchange for the reigning Serie A top scorer Luis Vinicio in 1966. In 1968, he returned to Inter for a season, after notable performances with Vicenza, but he was subsequently sold to Cagliari Calcio, along with Angelo Domenghini, in exchange for Roberto Boninsegna. With Inter he won the 1964–65 and the 1965–66 Serie A titles, as well as the 1964–65 European Cup, and the 1965 Intercontinental Cup.

During the 1969–70 Serie A season, he was a key member of the starting line-up of the Cagliari formation that won the first and sole scudetto (Italian title) in its history, forming an experimental attacking duo with Gigi Riva, often functioning as a supporting striker behind Riva. His performances that season earned him a call up at the 1970 World Cup with his national team.

In 1975 Gori moved to Juventus, where he spent two seasons, winning his fourth scudetto and the UEFA Cup during the 1976–77 season. He ended his Serie A career with Hellas Verona F.C. during the 1977–78 season, subsequently ending his career in 1979, after a season with Sant'Angelo in Serie C2, helping the team to Serie C1 promotion. He is one of five footballers to win Serie A with three clubs, a feat he managed with Inter, Cagliari, and Juventus; the other five players to have managed the same feat are Giovanni Ferrari, Pietro Fanna, Aldo Serena and Attilio Lombardo.

International career
Gori made his Italy debut at the 1970 FIFA World Cup, in the quarter-final match against hosts Mexico, coming on for Domenghini; Italy went on to reach the final of the tournament. He made two more appearances for the Italian national side in 1970 following the World Cup.

Honours

Club
Inter
Serie A: 1964–65, 1965–66
European Cup: 1964–65
Intercontinental Cup: 1965

Cagliari
Serie A: 1969–70

Juventus
Serie A: 1976–77
UEFA Cup: 1976–77

International
Italy
FIFA World Cup: 1970 (Runner-up)

References

1946 births
Living people
Footballers from Milan
Italian footballers
Italy international footballers
Serie A players
Serie C players
Inter Milan players
Juventus F.C. players
L.R. Vicenza players
Cagliari Calcio players
Hellas Verona F.C. players
1970 FIFA World Cup players
UEFA Cup winning players
Association football forwards